Oberhofer is an American band.

It may also refer to:
Herbert Oberhofer, Austrian footballer
Karin Oberhofer, Italian biathlete
Renate Oberhofer, Italian skier

See also
Emil Oberhoffer, American musician